Up in the Air may refer to:

Literature
 Up in the Air (novel), a 2001 novel by Walter Kirn

Film and television

 Up in the Air (1940 film), an American film directed by Howard Bretherton
 "Up in the Air", a 1992 episode of ChuckleVision
 Up in the Air (2009 film), an adaptation of the Walter Kirn novel, starring George Clooney
 "Up in the Air" (Eureka), a 2011 episode of Eureka

Music
 "Up in the Air", a 1960 song by Johnny Preston
 "Up in the Air", a song by Hüsker Dü from their 1987 album Warehouse: Songs and Stories 
 Up in the Air, a 1995 album by The Silly Pillows
 Up in the Air (soundtrack), a soundtrack album from the 2009 film
 "Up in the Air" (song), a 2013 song by Thirty Seconds to Mars

See also
 "Up in the Air, Junior Birdmen", a song for new aviators